Borikenophis is a genus of snakes in the family Colubridae endemic to the Puerto Rican archipelago and the Virgin Islands.

Etymology
The genus name comes from Borikén, the Taíno word for Puerto Rico and ophis, Greek for "snake".

Species
Listed alphabetically.
 Borikenophis portoricensis (Reinhardt & Lütken, 1862) – Puerto Rican racer (Puerto Rico, Virgin Islands)
 Borikenophis prymnus (Schwartz, 1966) – Puerto Rican racer (Puerto Rico)
 Borikenophis sanctaecrucis (Cope, 1862) – St. Croix racer (St. Croix, U.S. Virgin Islands) - possibly extinct
 Borikenophis variegatus (Schmidt, 1926) – Mona racer (Mona Island)

References

Borikenophis
Snakes of the Caribbean